Lyudmila Karachik (born 8 December 1994) is an Uzbekistani footballer who plays as a forward for Women's Championship club Bunyodkor and the Uzbekistan women's national team.

International goals

See also
List of Uzbekistan women's international footballers

References 

1994 births
Living people
Women's association football forwards
Uzbekistani women's footballers
Sportspeople from Tashkent
Uzbekistan women's international footballers
Uzbekistani women's futsal players
20th-century Uzbekistani women
21st-century Uzbekistani women